Paqalat (also Romanized as Pāqalāt and Pā Qalāt; also known as Bā Qalāt, Bāqlāt, Pā Ghalāt, Paghelat, Pa Kalāt, Pā Oalāt, and Pa yi Kalāt) is a village in Kal Rural District, Eshkanan District, Lamerd County, Fars Province, Iran. At the 2006 census, its population was 1,007, in 189 families.

References 

Populated places in Lamerd County